The Autobianchi Giardiniera is a supermini produced by the Italian automaker Autobianchi, based on the Fiat 500 Giardiniera. The Fiat version being offered since 1960. It was available in various configurations: station wagon and van. Car was produced from 1968 to 1977 effectively replacing the Fiat counterpart. It was also marketed as the Autobianchi Bianchina Giardiniera. The overall layout was very similar to the earlier Panoramica but the Giardiniera was more utilitarian oriented and ideally suited for light commerce. It also retained the same exterior design from Fiat with only a badge change, and still featured the suicide doors.

Production

References

Giardiniera
Rear-engined vehicles
1960s cars
1970s cars
Station wagons